Mohawk Lake is located in Waterford Township, Michigan. The 23-acre lake lies south of Lake Angeus Rd. and north of Walton Blvd. 
At its deepest point, the lake is 33 feet deep.

Mohawk Lake connects to Wormer Lake and to Lake Angelus.

Fish
Mohawk Lake fish include Largemouth Bass, Bluegill and Yellow Perch.

References

Lakes of Oakland County, Michigan
Lakes of Michigan
Lakes of Waterford Township, Michigan